Caroline Glick (born 1969) is an American-born Israeli conservative columnist, journalist, and author. She writes for Israel Hayom, Breitbart News, The Jerusalem Post, and Maariv. She is adjunct senior fellow for Middle Eastern Affairs at the Washington, D.C.-based Center for Security Policy, and directs the Israeli Security Project at the David Horowitz Freedom Center. In 2019, she was a candidate on the Israeli political party New Right's list for Knesset.

Early life and education
Glick was born in Houston Texas, U.S., to a Jewish family. They moved to Chicago when she was a baby, and she grew up in the Hyde Park neighborhood. She graduated from Columbia College, Columbia University, in 1991 with a Bachelor of Arts in political science.

As a teenager traveling with her parents and siblings, she visited Israel for the first time at the onset of the First Lebanon War. Glick immigrated to Israel in 1991, and joined the Israel Defense Forces (IDF).

She is the sister of American diplomat Bonnie Glick. In 2007 she married Jerusalem attorney Ephraim Katzir, but they divorced. Later, Glick married Shimon Suisa.

Career

Military
Glick joined the Israel Defense Force in August 1991. She served in the IDF's Judge Advocate General division during the First Intifada in 1992, and, while there, edited and co-authored an IDF-published book, Israel, the Intifada, and the Rule of Law. Following the Oslo Accords, she worked as coordinator of negotiations with the Palestinian Authority. She retired from the military with the rank of captain at the end of 1996.

Government
After her demobilisation, Glick worked for about a year as the assistant to the director general of the Israel Antiquities Authority. She then served as assistant foreign policy advisor to Prime Minister Benjamin Netanyahu in 1997–1998. Glick returned to the US to earn a Master of Arts in Public Policy from Harvard Kennedy School in 2000.

Journalism
Following her return to Israel, she became the chief diplomatic correspondent for the Makor Rishon newspaper, for which she wrote a weekly column in Hebrew. She was also the deputy managing editor of The Jerusalem Post, and served as senior columnist and senior contributing editor until early 2019. In the summer of 2019, Glick joined Israel's largest circulation newspaper Israel Hayom, where she works as a senior columnist for its Hebrew and English editions. Her writings have appeared in The Wall Street Journal, the New York Times, National Review, The Boston Globe, the Chicago Sun-Times, Commentary Magazine, The Washington Times, Maariv, Moment, and other newspapers. Glick has also contributed to many online journals. In addition to appearing on Israel's major television networks, she has appeared on US television programs seen on MSNBC and the Fox News Channel. She makes frequent radio appearances both in the US and Israel.

In 2003, during Operation Iraqi Freedom, Glick was embedded with the US Army's 3rd Infantry Division, and filed front-line reports for The Jerusalem Post and the Chicago Sun-Times. Via satellite phone, she also reported daily from the front lines for the Israeli Channel 1 news. Glick was on the scene when US forces took the Baghdad International Airport. She was awarded a distinguished civilian service award from the U.S. Secretary of the Army for her battlefield reporting.

She is the author of The Israeli Solution: A One State Plan for Peace in the Middle East, and Shackled Warrior: Israel and the Global Jihad. She is the adjunct senior fellow for Middle Eastern Affairs at the Center for Security Policy, and is one of several co-authors of the center's latest book, War Footing. She served in the past as senior researcher at the IDF's Operational Theory Research Institute (the Israel Defense establishment's most prestigious think tank). She has also worked as an adjunct lecturer in tactical warfare at the IDF's Command and Staff College. She has been identified as part of the counter-jihad movement, and has stated that the US and Israel is fighting a "counter-jihad" against "global jihad".

In its Israeli Independence Day supplement in 2003, Israeli newspaper Maariv named her the most prominent woman in Israel. She was the 2005 recipient of the Zionist Organization of America's Ben Hecht award for Outstanding Journalism (previous recipients have included A. M. Rosenthal, Sidney Zion, and Daniel Pipes). She has also been awarded the Abramowitz Prize for Media Criticism by Israel Media Watch. A representative for the organization praised Glick's high degree of professionalism and her critical reporting, after Glick wrote a series of articles accusing the Israeli media of blatantly rallying support for carrying out the disengagement plan. On May 31, 2009, she received the Guardian of Zion Award from the Ingeborg Rennert Center for Jerusalem Studies at Bar Ilan University.

She founded and edited the Hebrew language political satire website Latma TV from 2009 to 2013.

In July 2012, the David Horowitz Freedom Center announced the hiring of Glick as the Director of its Israel Security Project.

Politics
In a Jerusalem Post opinion piece on the subject of the Iran nuclear agreement published on August 13, 2015, Glick presented American Jewry at a crossroads, being threatened by President Obama to risk both alienation from the Democratic Party and a weakening of the traditional Israeli-USA relationship if the influential American Jewish leaders fail to support the nuclear deal.

In January 2019, she became a member of the Israeli New Right party. She unsuccessfully ran for election to the Knesset in the 2019 (April) elections in the sixth position on the New Right party's electoral list.

Reception
The Israeli Solution: A One-State Plan for Peace in the Middle East, Glick's advocacy of the annexation of the West Bank into a Jewish state, was published in February 2014. Glick wrote an introductory article for The Jerusalem Post. One reviewer in the United Arab Emirates' The National was intrigued, but found the book problematic and flawed, found the author's history to be "mendacious", and saw the likely result as collapse into civil war. Another review at the Asia Times earned more sympathy: The reviewer approves Glick's demographic study (although with caveat, due to Sergio DellaPergola), and concludes that, "If you read only one book about the Middle East this year, it should be Caroline Glick's".

We Con the World
In June 2010, Glick co-produced and appeared in We Con the World, a satirical video by Latma TV about the Gaza flotilla attempt to breach the Israeli blockade of Gaza. The video clip quickly gained over 3,000,000 hits from YouTube viewers, before being abruptly removed by the online hosting site due to alleged copyright infringement; Glick disputed the infringement charges, claiming a right of fair use. The video drew both criticism and praise. Writing for The Guardian, Meron Rapoport said the video was "anti-Muslim", while Eileen Read, writing for The Huffington Post, described the mocking of the flotilla crew as "tasteless and blatantly racist". Glick has dismissed claims that the video is offensive, saying: "The point of satire is to make people uncomfortable. We're not trying to be fair and balanced, we're trying to make a point."

Bibliography

Books
 Yahav, David; Amit-Kohntitle, Uzi. Edited and wrote several chapters. Israel, the Intifada and the Rule of Law. Israel Ministry of Defense Publications, 1993. .
 Gaffney Jr., Frank J.; et al. Contributions to "Part IV: Waging the 'War of Ideas'". War Footing: 10 Steps America Must Take to Prevail in the War for the Free World. Naval Institute Press, 2005. 
 Glick, Caroline. Shackled Warrior: Israel and the Global Jihad. Gefen Publishing House, 2008. 
 Glick, Caroline. The Israeli Solution: A One-State Plan for Peace in the Middle East. Crown Forum, 2014.

Documentaries
 Glick is featured as a speaker in the documentaries Relentless: The Struggle for Peace in the Middle East and Obsession: Radical Islam's War Against the West.

See also
 David Horowitz

References

External links

 

1969 births
Living people
American emigrants to Israel
American political writers
American women journalists
American women writers
American Zionists
Columbia College (New York) alumni
Counter-jihad activists
Israeli Jews
Israeli newspaper editors
Israeli women journalists
Israeli women writers
Jewish American writers
Jewish women writers
Harvard Kennedy School alumni
The Jerusalem Post people
Women newspaper editors
Writers from Chicago
Writers on the Middle East
New Right (Israel) politicians
Moskowitz Prize for Zionism laureates
21st-century American Jews
21st-century American women